Carposina mediella is a moth in the Carposinidae family. It was described by Francis Walker in 1866. It is found in Australia, where it has been recorded from Tasmania, South Australia, New South Wales, Victoria, Queensland and Western Australia.

References

Carposinidae
Moths described in 1866
Moths of Australia